Malchin is a town in the Mecklenburgische Seenplatte district, in Mecklenburg-Western Pomerania, Germany. It offers some notable landmarks, such as two Brick Gothic town gates, a medieval defense tower, the Gothic town church of St. Johannis and the Neo Baroque town hall. The former municipality Duckow was merged into Malchin in January 2019.

People from Malchin 
 Cordula Wöhler (1845–1916), writer and hymnwriter
 Siegfried Marcus (1831-1898), inventor
 Joachim Christian Timm (1734-1805), botanist
 Thomas Doll (1966-), footballer

References

External links 

 
 Official website of Malchin (German)

Cities and towns in Mecklenburg
1230s establishments in the Holy Roman Empire
1236 establishments in Europe
Populated places established in the 13th century
Grand Duchy of Mecklenburg-Schwerin